Sir Adam Hay, 7th Baronet (14 December 1795 – 18 January 1867) was a Scottish baronet and politician.

He was the Member of Parliament (MP) for Lanark Burghs from 1826 to 1830.

He was the brother of Sir John Hay, 6th Baronet (1788–1838).

He lived at 12 Atholl Crescent in Edinburgh's West End.

References

External links 
 

1795 births
1867 deaths
Baronets in the Baronetage of Nova Scotia
Members of the Parliament of the United Kingdom for Scottish constituencies
UK MPs 1826–1830